The Renault 5 Turbo or R5 Turbo is a sport hatchback automobile launched by the French manufacturer Renault at the Brussels Motor Show in January 1980. The car was primarily designed for rallying, but was also sold in a street version. 

A total of 4,987 (1,820 Turbo 1 and 3,167 Turbo 2) R5 Turbos were manufactured during the six-year production run.

Design
In response to Lancia's rallying success with the mid-engined Stratos, Renault's Jean Terramorsi, vice-president of production came up with the idea of creating a new sports version of the Renault 5 Alpine supermini. The distinctive new rear bodywork was styled by Marc Deschamps at Bertone, headed by Chief Designer Marcello Gandini. A Renault 5 Alpine was sent to Bertone in October 1977 to be used as a "mannequin." The car's code name was Projet 822.

Although the standard Renault 5 has a front-mounted engine, the 5 Turbo featured a mid-mounted  Cléon-Fonte with fuel fed by Bosch K-Jetronic fuel injection and a Garrett AiResearch T3 turbocharger OHV 2 valves per cylinder Inline-four engine placed behind the driver in mid-body in a modified Renault 5 chassis.

Though it used a modified body from a standard Renault 5 and was badged a Renault 5, the mechanicals were radically different. The most obvious difference was the rear-wheel drive and rear-mid engine instead of the normal version's front-wheel drive and front-mounted engine. The engineers creating the Turbo used parts from various other Renault models: the rear suspension was derived from that of the rear-engined Renault Alpine A310 V6 while the five-speed manual transmission was the unit from the Renault 30 TX, rotated through 180 degrees. At the time of its launch, it was the most powerful production French car.

The first 400 production 5 Turbos were made to comply with Group 4 homologation to allow the car to compete in international rallies, and were manufactured at the Alpine factory in Dieppe. Many parts later transferred to the Alpine A310, such as the suspension or alloy wheel set.

Renault 5 Turbo 2

Once the homologation models were produced, a second version named Turbo 2 was introduced using more stock Renault 5 parts replacing many of the light-alloy components in the original 5 Turbo version, and dropping the specific Bertone seats and dashboard for the interior of the R5 Alpine. Many parts also became dark grey rather than the iconic red or blue. To differentiate it from the Turbo 2, the original 5 Turbo is often referred as "Turbo 1".

The concept of a mid-engined small Renault returned with the 1998 announcement of the Renault Clio V6.

Renault 5 Turbo & Turbo 2 in North America
  The original plan called for 1,000 Renault 5 Turbo cars to be built to meet the requirements for Group 3 homologation, with an eye to building an additional 3,000 factory U.S. Models for sale in the United States. This did not actually happen. 

Instead the vehicle was available to Americans via the burgeoning grey market (1976-1988), in which European street legal cars were converted to U.S. specifications.

Awards
In 2004, Sports Car International named the R5 Turbo number nine on the list of Top Sports Cars of the 1980s.

Motorsport

The R5 Turbo was conceived with dual intent, promoting the sales of the common R5 and being homologated in the FIA group 3 and 4 categories of the rally championship (today WRC). All the motorsport derivatives were based on the Turbo 1.

The final Renault 5 Maxi Turbo Superproduction reached  and won the French Supertouring Championship that year.

The Renault 5 Turbo competed in the sub-2000 cc category, thanks to the multiplication factor of 1.4 which was applied to turbocharged engines. FISA restricted tire and wheel sizes based on engine size, so for the Maxi Turbo, Renault enlarged to engine to 1527 cc which brought it up to 2138 cc in the eyes of the regulatory agencies - placing it in the 2000–2500 cc category and allowing for the fitment of wider wheels at the expense of a higher minimum weight.

Driven by Jean Ragnotti in 1981, the 5 Turbo won the Monte Carlo Rally on its first outing in the World Rally Championship.

WRC victories

There are several victories throughout the early 1980s in the national championships in France, Portugal, Switzerland, Hungary, and Spain, as well as victories in international rallies throughout Europe, with wins in iconic rallies such as Monte Carlo. 

After the factory ceased support, it underwent development by many teams and enthusiasts to compete in regional championships and local races in which it was ubiquitous and successful for almost 20 years. 

Later, the newly created historical categories allowed these celebrated cars to return to international events and competitions.

References

Further reading

External links

 
 Renault 5 Turbo 2 , retrieved on 1 August 2008

Group B cars
Group 4 (racing) cars
Rear mid-engine, rear-wheel-drive vehicles
5 Turbo
Cars introduced in 1980
Cars discontinued in 1986